The ASAB Medal is a scientific award given by the Association for the Study of Animal Behaviour (ASAB).  It is cast in bronze to a design by Jonathan Kingdon, awarded "annually for contributions to the science of animal behaviour - through teaching, writing, broadcasting, research, through fostering any of these activities, or through contributing to the affairs of ASAB itself."

ASAB Medallists
 1995 John Maynard Smith
 1996 Nicholas B. Davies
 1997 Robert A. Hinde
 1998 Aubrey W.G. Manning
 1999 Peter J.B. Slater
 2000 John R. Krebs
 2001 P.P.G. Bateson
 2002 Geoffrey A. Parker
 2003 John C. Wingfield
 2004 John Alcock
 2005 Linda Partridge
 2006 Felicity Huntingford
 2007 Robert Elwood
 2008 Christopher John Barnard
 2009 Marian Stamp Dawkins
 2010 Michael Dockery
 2011 Alan Grafen
 2012 Tim Birkhead
 2013 Alasdair Houston and John McNamara
 2014 Tim Clutton-Brock
 2015 Pat Monaghan
 2016 
 2017 Jane Hurst
 2018 Innes Cuthill

References

British science and technology awards
Ethology